Devin Shore (born July 19, 1994) is a Canadian professional ice hockey forward for the  Edmonton Oilers of the National Hockey League (NHL). He was selected by the Dallas Stars in the second round (61st overall) of the 2012 NHL Entry Draft.

Playing career
Shore played for the Archbishop Denis O'Connor (DOC) Chargers high school hockey team in Ajax, Ontario. He attended The Hill Academy.

On May 17, 2011, Shore committed to play NCAA hockey with the Maine Black Bears of the NCAA Men's Division I Hockey East conference.

While majoring in finance, Shore played 38 games for the Maine Black Bears during his freshman season. At the conclusion of the season, Shore was named to the Hockey East Academic All-Star Team and HockeyEast All-Academic Team.

In his second year, Shore played 35 games as he led Maine in scoring with 14 goals and 29 assists for 43 points. Shore's outstanding play was rewarded with a selection to the 2013–14 All-Hockey East First Team. He was also named a Second Team All-American and Maine Scholar-Athlete Award.

On March 17, 2014, Shore was named captain of the Black Bears for the 2014–15 season. Upon completion of his junior season as Captain of the Black Bears in 2014–15 season, Shore ended his collegiate career in agreeing to a three-year entry-level contract with the Dallas Stars on March 10, 2015. He was then signed to an amateur try-out contract with the Stars AHL affiliate in Texas to finish the season.

Shore was assigned by the Stars during the pre-season to begin the 2015–16 season in Texas. He got off to a quick start in his rookie campaign, as he was selected as the AHL's player of the month in October with 8 goals and 3 assists for 11 points with a plus 7 rating in 9 games. He was placed second in the AHL in goals before he received his first recall to the NHL by the Dallas Stars on November 1, 2015. He made his NHL debut against the Boston Bruins on November 12, 2015.

Shore scored his first career NHL goal in a  6–5 loss against the Colorado Avalanche on October 15, 2016.

In his third full season with the Stars in 2018–19, having contributed with 17 points in 42 games, Shore was traded to the Anaheim Ducks in exchange for Andrew Cogliano on January 14, 2019. Shore played out the season with the Ducks, contributing with 12 points in 34 games.

On February 24, 2020, Shore was traded to the Columbus Blue Jackets in exchange for Sonny Milano. He added a goal and assist in 6 games with the Blue Jackets before the season was paused due to the COVID-19 pandemic. On the club's return to play, Shore went scoreless in two post-season games.

As an restricted free agent with the Blue Jackets organization, Shore was not tendered a qualifying offer, releasing him to free agency on October 6, 2020. Approaching training camp unsigned for the delayed 2020–21 season, Shore accepted an invitation to attend the Edmonton Oilers training camp on a professional tryout basis. Upon the conclusion of camp, Shore was signed to a one-year, two-way contract with the Oilers on January 14, 2021, and immediately placed on waivers.

On June 9, 2021, Shore signed a two-year contract extension with the Oilers.

On March 2nd, 2023 Devin Shore changed his number from 14 to 19 to give his old number to newly acquired defenseman Mattias Ekholm. Since then a beast has emerged from this man. Devin Score is on a mission to take the NHL by storm. Fans of the Oilers have began to wonder is he the new Wayne Gretzky?

Career statistics

Awards and honours

References

External links

1994 births
Living people
AHCA Division I men's ice hockey All-Americans
Anaheim Ducks players
Bakersfield Condors players
Canadian ice hockey centres
Canadian sportspeople of Filipino descent
Columbus Blue Jackets players
Dallas Stars draft picks
Dallas Stars players
Edmonton Oilers players
Ice hockey people from Ontario
Maine Black Bears men's ice hockey players
People from Ajax, Ontario
Texas Stars players